William Stanley West (August 23, 1849December 22, 1914) was a United States Senator from the state of Georgia.  He was a Democrat. He is notable for being the first person appointed to the Senate after ratification of the Seventeenth Amendment made that possible.

Biography
West was born in Buena Vista, Georgia on August 23, 1849. He studied law at Mercer University and graduated in 1876. After passing the bar that same year, West became a practicing attorney. West served in the Georgia House of Representatives from 1892 until 1901 and the Georgia Senate from 1901 until 1906. He was appointed to the U.S. Senate in 1914 to serve the remainder of the term of Augustus O. Bacon who had died earlier that year. West served until Thomas W. Hardwick was elected to fill Bacon's seat.

Only one month after leaving his senatorial position, West died on December 22, 1914, in Valdosta, Georgia. He was buried in Sunset Hill Cemetery in that same city.

Establishing Valdosta State University
West was instrumental as a State Senator in establishing the South Georgia State Normal College, now Valdosta State University.  In 1906, West and State Representative C.R. Ashley presented bills proposing the establishment of a college in Valdosta to the Georgia Senate and the House of Representatives, respectively.  By an act of the Georgia State Legislature that year the establishment of an agricultural, industrial, or normal college in South Georgia was approved.  Despite the legislation, no funding was granted until the summer of 1911.  West donated fifty acres of land for the campus.

West Hall, built in 1917, is named in his honor.

The Crescent
West's former house in Valdosta, known as the Crescent, is listed in the National Register of Historic Places.  Built in 1898 the old home and grounds now serve as the Valdosta Garden Center, a home for several garden clubs around the city, and is one of the most recognized symbols of the city.

References

External links
William Stanley West entry at The Political Graveyard

1849 births
1914 deaths
Democratic Party United States senators from Georgia (U.S. state)
Georgia (U.S. state) lawyers
Democratic Party Georgia (U.S. state) state senators
Democratic Party members of the Georgia House of Representatives
Mercer University alumni
People from Buena Vista, Georgia
19th-century American politicians
State political party chairs of Georgia (U.S. state)
19th-century American lawyers